Justin Smith may refer to:

Entertainment
 Justin Smith (actor), Australian television and stage actor
 Justin Smith (poker player) (born 1988), American poker player
 Justin Smith (presenter) (born 1968), Australian journalist, radio presenter, producer and writer
 Justin Smith (born 1978), American hip hop music producer known as Just Blaze
 Justin Smith, member of the singing group Jericho Road

Sports
 Justin Smith (basketball) (born 1999), American basketball player
 Justin Smith (defensive end) (born 1979), former American football defensive end
 Justin Smith (linebacker) (born 1979), American football player
 Justin Smith (rugby league) (born 1977), Australian rugby league player
 Justin Smith (soccer) (born 2003), Canadian soccer player

Other
 Justin Smith (milliner) (born 1978), British hat maker
 Justin A. Smith (1818–1879), New York politician
 Justin B. Smith (born 1969), American businessman at Bloomberg
 Justin E. H. Smith (born 1972), Canadian-American philosopher and author
 Justin Harvey Smith (1857–1930), American historian